Opened in 1980, St. Mark Catholic High School is located in Manotick, a neighbourhood in the city of Ottawa. Its enrollment is currently around 1100 after losing about 600 students to St. Francis Xavier Catholic High School in 2009 & 2010, after the completion of its construction in 2009. St. Francis Xavier is located just down Limebank Road, less than 10 minutes from St. Mark.

History
Originally built in 1980 as Southern Catholic Junior High with only grades 7 and 8, St. Mark received extensions and added grades 9 through 12 over the next seven years. There are a few original faculty members who still teach at St. Mark along with many others who have long been a part of the staff. In 2005, St. Mark celebrated its 25th anniversary and past faculty and alumni were invited to attend reunion festivities.

Every year since 1987, they have held their Canned Food Drive, with a one-year record of over 72,000 canned food items. With a last minute blitz on Monday, October 26, 2009, collecting over 5,000 cans, and in total about 62,000 for the 2009 edition, St. Mark surpassed the 1,000,000 can mark for the 22 years it has been held. The school has gained increasing media publicity because of the food drive.

Sports

In 2006 the senior boys football team won the National Capital Bowl, played between the champions of Ottawa, Eastern Ontario, and Central Ontario.
In 2009, the Jr. varsity girls soccer team, senior boys rugby team, junior boys football team and varsity girls football team all brought home city championships. In December 2010 the Boys Varsity Hockey Team captured the non-contact Tier 1 City Championships in a best of 3 final.
In 2008, the St. Mark varsity cheerleading team won the Cheer Alliance national championships in the school large senior advanced division along with the title grand champions of the school advanced division. The school is also responsible for the first ever Girls Tackle Football team in Ottawa as of the 2018/19 school year.

Notable alumni
Evan MacDonald, Olympic Wrestler
Slater Koekkoek, hockey player
Stefanie McKeough, hockey player
Scott Mitchell (offensive lineman), Canadian football offensive linemen
Seanna Mitchell, swimmer
Will Petschenig, hockey player

See also
List of Ottawa schools
List of high schools in Ontario

References
3. https://www.cfl.ca/2019/04/30/redblacks-host-female-high-school-game-td-place/

150 years of Catholic Education in Ottawa-Carleton 1856-2006, Ottawa-Carleton Catholic School Board, 2006

External links

St. Mark's OCCSB Profile
St. Mark's Historical Profile

Catholic secondary schools in Ontario
High schools in Ottawa
Educational institutions established in 1980
1980 establishments in Ontario
Middle schools in Ottawa